Prumnacris is a monotypic genus of grasshoppers in the subfamily Melanoplinae, from NE America: where Prumnacris rainierensis can be found.

References

Further reading

External links

 

Melanoplinae
Articles created by Qbugbot